The Bombay Light Horse was raised in 1885 and formed part of Indian Volunteer Force, later (post 1917) the Indian Defence Force and finally (post 1920) the Auxiliary Force (India).

A light horse regiment was roughly equivalent to half a battalion in strength (~ 400 men) and its troops typically fought as mounted infantry rather than traditional cavalry.

It was not mobilized as a unit during World War I or World War II but individuals did serve, mainly with the British Indian Army.

The regiment was disbanded when India became independent in August 1947.

References

Military units and formations established in 1885